The  (HSUH) is a private university in Tobetsu, Hokkaido, Japan, established in 1974. The president is Norio Niikawa.

Organization

Undergraduate
Pharmaceutical science
Dentistry
Nursing & social services
Psychological science
Rehabilitation science

Graduate
Pharmaceutical science
Dentistry
Nursing & social services
Psychological science
Rehabilitation science

See also
 Hokkaidō-Iryōdaigaku Station, the nearby railway station, named after the university

External links
  

Educational institutions established in 1974
Pharmacy schools in Japan
Private universities and colleges in Japan
Universities and colleges in Hokkaido
1974 establishments in Japan
Hokkaido American Football Association